U with diaeresis (Ӱ ӱ; italics: Ӱ ӱ) is a letter of the Cyrillic script, derived from the Cyrillic letter U (У у У у).

U with diaeresis is used in the alphabets of the Altai, Khakas, Khanty, Mari and Shor languages, where it represents the close front rounded vowel , the pronunciation of the Latin letter U with umlaut (Ü ü) in German. It is also used in the Komi-Yodzyak language.

Usage
Cyrillic U with Diaeresis was formally used in The Rusyn language.

Computing codes

See also
Ü ü : Latin U with diaeresis - an Azerbaijani, Estonian, German, Hungarian, Turkish, and Turkmen letter
Ư ư : Latin letter U with horn, used in Vietnamese alphabet
Y y : Latin letter Y
Ӳ ӳ : Cyrillic letter U with double acute
Ү ү : Cyrillic letter Ue
Ұ ұ : Cyrillic letter straight U with stroke (Kazakh mid U)
U u: Latin letter U, same sound in French, Icelandic and Dutch
Cyrillic characters in Unicode

References

Cyrillic letters with diacritics
Letters with diaeresis